The Institute for European Politics (IEP; Institut für Europäische Politik in German) is a German foreign and European policy research centre based in Berlin. It is an independent non-governmental organization.

History
The IEP was founded in 1959, being one of the earliest foreign and European policy research centres in Germany. The institute is a founding member of the Trans-European Policy Studies Association (TEPSA) and became a member of the German European Movement in 1962. Mathias Jopp served as the director of the IEP. Wolfgang Wessels is the chair of the IEP's executive committee. It is based in Berlin.

Objectives and fields of study
The IEP focuses on European politics and integration. To this end the institute organizes research projects, conferences and study groups.

Funders
Major sponsors of IEP are governmental agencies, foundations, donations and project-related income. The European Union also supports IEP.

References

1959 establishments in West Germany
European integration think tanks
Organisations based in Berlin
Think tanks established in 1959
Think tanks based in Germany